Mitcham station may refer to:

Mitcham railway station (England), a former station in London
Mitcham Eastfields railway station, London
Mitcham Junction station, London
Mitcham railway station, Adelaide, Australia
Mitcham railway station, Melbourne, Australia
Mitcham tram stop, London